Veerakeralampudur is a taluk in Tenkasi district in the Indian state of Tamil Nadu.

Economy

Agriculture
Agriculture is the main occupation. Most of the people work in farm fields and rolling Beedi. The main crops are paddy, onion, tomato, brinjal, tamarind, green chili, red chili, coconut. It is also known for its vast paddy and coconut fields. Most of the last generation of residents were farmers; however, many are now employed in various parts of India and in foreign countries such as the United States, Singapore, Malaysia and the Persian Gulf.

Geography and Climate
It has an average elevation of 101 meters above mean sea level. The climate is dry and hot, with Southwest monsoon rains during October–December. Temperatures during summer reach a maximum of 40 and a minimum of 26.3 °C, though temperatures over 43 °C are not uncommon. Winter temperatures range between 29.6 and 18 °C. The average annual rainfall is about 85 cm.

The town is surrounded by two rivers Chittar River and Hanumanathi. Both Hanumanathi and Chittar River merges rightly exactly in this village thus forming the major tributary to Thamirabarani River.

Revenue Villages
The Revenue Villages which fall under Veerakeralampudur are:

 Achankundram
 Agaram
 Anaikulam
 Kalluthu
 Karuvantha
 Keelakalangal
 Kulaiyaneri
 Kurichampatti
 Marukkalankulam
 Melakalangal
 Melamaruthappapuram
 Muthammalpuram
 Navaneethakrishnapuram
 Palapathiraramapuram
 Rajagopalaperi
 Sivagurunathapuram
 Surandai
 Thayarthoppu
 Uthumalai
 Thuthikulam
 Vadakkukavalakurichi
 Vadi
 Veerakeralampudur
 Veeranam
 Vellakkal
 Zaminsurandai

Demographics
VEERAKERALAMPUDUR-RURAL

Education

Schools

 Government Hr. sec School
 Anna Boys Hr. sec School
 St. Antony's girls Hr. sec School
 RC Primary School
 Government Primary School
 Anna Primary School

Colleges Near Veerakeralampudur
 Government ITI - Veerakeralampudur
 Anna Teacher Training Institute, Veerakeralampudur
 Sardar Raja Engineering College,(6 km from Veerakeralampudur)Tenkasi-Alangulam road, Athiuttru, Tamizhlur, Alangulam.
 Government College of Arts & Science (Surandai) (6 km from Veerakeralampudur)
 M.S.P.V.L. Polytechnic (10 km from Veerakeralampudur), Pavoorchatram
 Senthil Andaver Polytechnic (12 km from Veerakeralampudur), Ayikudi - Tenkasi
 Sattanathar Karaiyalar arts college Tenkasi
 J.P College of Engineering (12 km from Veerakeralampudur), Ayikudi - Tenkasi
 J.P Arts & Science College (12 km from Veerakeralampudur), Ayikudi - Tenkasi

Festival
 Sri Navaneethekrishna Swamy Temple Car Festival.

References

Cities and towns in Tenkasi district